Adélard Charles Trottier (November 8, 1879 – November 29, 1955) was a physician, surgeon and politician in Ontario, Canada. He represented Essex North in the Legislative Assembly of Ontario from 1934 to 1943 as a Liberal.

The son of Narcisse Trottier and Marie Savage, he was born in Lacolle, Quebec. He taught school for several years. In 1908, Trottier married Beatrice Girard. He served as president of the Medical Society of Ontario.

He was one of several Liberal MPPs elected to constituencies with large French-speaking populations in 1934. Trottier was reelected in 1937.

References

External links

1879 births
1955 deaths
Ontario Liberal Party MPPs
20th-century Canadian physicians
Franco-Ontarian people